HC Red Ice Martigny-Verbier-Entremont was a Swiss ice hockey club.

History 
HC Red Ice was founded in 2008 and issued from the fusion of HC Martigny and HC Verbier Val-de-Bagnes. The first team of HC Red Ice is  a member of the Swiss League's National League B.

After only three years, HC Red Ice has been involved in the regional final for (Western Switzerland) three times, winning two of them (in 2010 and 2011). During the 2010–2011, HC Red Ice won all 22 matches of the regular league championship before the play-offs phase.

Relegation and promotion 
 1956-74: National League B
 1983-87: Swiss Division 1 (Promoted)
 1987-99: National League B (Relegated due to financial reasons)
 1999-2005: Swiss Division 1 (Promoted)
 2005-08: National League B (Relegated due to financial reasons)
 2008-12: Swiss Division 1 (Promoted)
 2012-17: National League B 
 2017–present: currently inactive. Team filed for bankruptcy on June 14, 2017.

Retired numbers
 #10 - Petr Rosol
 #11 - Igor Fedulov

External links 
Official website
Official website of the Regioleague (1st Amateur League)
EliteProspects.com: Martigny Red Ice Team Page

Ice hockey teams in Switzerland